Cenicero  is a municipality in the autonomous community of La Rioja in Spain.

The municipality is the home of Bodegas Riojanas one of the oldest Rioja Houses, formed in 1890, situated next to the River Ebro, a 5th-generation family company, where Vina Albina Reserva is the second best selling Reserva in Spain. It is also the home of Marques De Caceres, United Wineries Bodegas Laguardia, Bodegas Murillo Viteri, and Pascali Vermouth from Pascal Valentin.

References

External links
 

Municipalities in La Rioja (Spain)